Moyle Rovers GAA are a Gaelic Athletic Association club in County Tipperary, Ireland.

History
The club derives its name from the river Moyle that runs through the Parish and joins the Anner. The club was founded in 1928. Previous to this since the 1800s various teams represented the parish in local leagues most often the Clonmel League. Kilsheelan GAA club have recorded games played against Powerstown in the early 1900s.

The 1990s

Football
The club's grounds, Monroe, was officially opened in 1990. Soon after in 1991 they won their first South senior football title and in 1995 their first ever County senior football championship final win. Further victories in this grade followed in 1996/98/99/00 along with these Moyle Rovers also won four South Senior football titles; and contested two Munster club finals also. In 2018, Moyle Rovers won their 8th county senior football championship beating Ardfinnan 1–15 to 1–7.

Hurling
1993 saw the club's junior hurling teams win the South A & B championships. In 1998 the club when they won the County junior "A" hurling championship for the first time.

Achievements in the Club

Football Titles Won

 Tipperary Senior Football Championship Winners 1995, 1996, 1998, 1999, 2000, 2007, 2009, 2018
 South Tipperary Senior Football Championship Winners 1991, 1995, 1996, 1998, 1999, 2000, 2006, 2007, 2008, 2009, 2010, 2017
 Clonmel Oil Senior Football League  1991, 1992, 1993
 Tipperary Men's Cup S.F.  1993
 Tipperary S.F.L Div. 1   1993
 Tipperary S.F.L. Dr Clifford Cup (1) 1999
 South Tipperary Intermediate Football Championship (2) 1966, 2012
 South Tipperary Junior A Football Championship Winners (6) 1931, 1959, 1976, 1981, 1989, 1998
 Tipperary Junior A Football Championship (3) 1931, 1959, 1998
 South Tipperary Junior B Football Championship' (2) 2006, 2014  2016
 South Tipperary Junior Football League (1) 1974
 Tipperary Under-21 Football Championship (4) 2007, 2008, 2009, 2017
 South Under-21 A Football Championship (9) 1974 (with Cahir), 1991, 2005, 2007, 2008, 2009, 2011, 2017, 2018
 Tipperary Under-21 B Football Championship (1) 1994
 South Tipperary Under-21 B Football Championship (1) 2004
 Tipperary Minor A Football Championship (4) 1984 (with Grangemockler as Slievenamon), 1987 (with Grangemockler as Slievenamon), 2003, 2008
 South Tipperary Minor A Football Championship (8) 1984 (with Grangemockler as Slievenamon), 1986 (with Grangemockler as Slievenamon), 1987 (with Grangemockler as Slievenamon), 2001, 2003, 2004, 2007, 2008
 Tipperary Minor B Football Championship (1) 1994
 South Minor B Football Championship (3) 1990, 1994, 1998
 Tipperary Minor C Football Championship (1) 2003
 South Tipperary Minor C Football Championship (1) 2003

Hurling Titles Won
 All-Ireland Junior Club Hurling Championship Runners-up 2008
 Munster Junior Club Hurling Championship Winners 2007
 Tipperary Junior A Hurling Championship Winners (2) 1998, 2007
 South Tipperary Junior A Hurling Championship (9) 1968, 1974, 1982, 1988, 1993, 1997, 1998, 2006, 2008
 South Tipperary Junior B Hurling Championship (3) 1993, 2008, 2010
 South Tipperary Junior Hurling League  1972, 1974, 1993, 1994
 South Tipperary Intermediate Hurling Championship (2) 2009, 2010
 South Tipperary Under-21 Hurling Championship (1) 2009
 Tipperary Under-21 B Hurling Championship (1) 2014
 South Tipperary Under-21 B Hurling Championship (2) 2007, 2014
 Tipperary Minor Hurling Championship (1) 2014
 South Tipperary Minor Hurling Championship (1) 2014

Juvenile Achievements

Football

U10 Football South Inaugural Championship: 1999
U10 Football South Championship: 2000
U12 A Football South Championship: 2000/'02
U12 A Football South & Co Championship: 1997/'01/'09
U12 A Football and Hurling South & County Double: 2009
U12 B Football South championship: 1993/'96
U14 Urban/Rural Football South & Co Championship: 1983
U14 Rural Football South & Co Championship: 1983
U14 Rural Football South Championship: 1982/'84
U14 A Football South & Co Championship: 1999/'00/'01
U14 A Football Peil na nOg South & Co: 1999/'02
U14 B Football South & Co Championship: 1997
U14 C Football South Championship: 1993
U16 A Football South Championship: 1993/'00/'01
U16 A Football South & Co Championship: 1985/'02/'03
U16 B Football South & Co Championship: 1998

Hurling

U12 C Hurling South Championship: 1993/'97
U14 A Hurling South and County Championship: 2017
U15 Rural Hurling South Championship: 1965
U16 C Hurling South Championship: 1994/'99
U16 B Hurling South & Co Championship: 2002, 2009

Ladies Football

U12 County Championship: 2001/2002/2007
Junior B Championship: 2002, 2006
Junior A Championship: 2007
Junior C: 2008
Minor B Championship: 2003

Notable players
 Declan Browne has two All Star football awards and has represented his country for the International Rules Series. Browne retired in December 2012. 
 Derry Foley has represented his country for the International Rules Series also.
 Alan Campbell
 Peter Acheson
 Sean Keating

References

External links
 www.moyle-rovers.tipperary.gaa.ie

Gaelic games clubs in County Tipperary
Hurling clubs in County Tipperary
Gaelic football clubs in County Tipperary